ASTM A490 and ASTM A490M are ASTM International standards for heavy hex structural bolts made from alloy steel. The imperial standard is officially titled Standard Specification for Structural Bolts, Alloy Steel, Heat Treated, 150 ksi Minimum Tensile Strength, while the metric standard (M) is titled Standard Specification for High-Strength Steel Bolts, Classes 10.9 and 10.9.3, for Structural Steel Joints.

In 2016, specifications A325 and A490 were officially withdrawn by ASTM and replaced by ASTM F3125. A325 and A490 heavy hex structural bolts are now grades under the new F3125 specification.

Connection types
There are also three connection types defined:

SC: A slip critical connection.
N: A bearing type connection where the threads are on the shear plane.
X: A bearing type connection where the threads are not on the shear plane.

Mechanical properties
These bolts are equivalent to ASTM A325 bolts in application and geometry, but are made to a higher strength. The imperial grades are made to the same strength specifications as ASTM A354 grade BD. The metric grades are made to the same strength specifications as ASTM F568M property class 10.9. Also, unlike their weaker counterparts they may not be coated by hot-dip galvanization, mechanical deposition, or electroplating.

Because these bolts are designed to be used in structural applications the threaded length of the bolts are shorter to keep the threads out of the joint.

References

ASTM standards
Screws
Structural steel